Elisabeth Ettlinger,  ( Lachmann; 14 July 1915 – 21 March 2012) was a German-born archaeologist and academic, who specialised in archaeology of the Roman provinces and Roman Switzerland. From 1964 to 1980, she taught at the University of Bern, having emigrated to Switzerland in the 1930s to escape Nazi Germany. Her research centred on Roman ceramics such as Terra Sigillata, and she co-founded Rei Cretariae Romanae Fautores, a learned society dedicated to Roman pottery: she was its secretary, vice-president and then served as its president from 1971 to 1980. From September 1963 to June 1964, she was a member of the Institute for Advanced Study in Princeton, New Jersey.

Honours
Ettlinger was elected to the German Archaeological Institute in 1968, and as a corresponding member of the Austrian Archaeological Institute in 1975. On 27 November 1975, she was elected a Fellow of the Society of Antiquaries of London (FSA).

Selected works

References

1915 births
2012 deaths
German archaeologists
Swiss archaeologists
German women archaeologists
Swiss women archaeologists
Academic staff of the University of Bern
Emigrants from Nazi Germany to Switzerland
Institute for Advanced Study visiting scholars
Fellows of the Society of Antiquaries of London
German Archaeological Institute
20th-century German women